Tabanus glaucopis, also known as the downland horsefly, is a species of biting horse-fly.

Distribution and habitat
This species is present in most of Europe, in the eastern Palearctic realm (Russia, Mongolia, and China) and in the Near East (Turkey and Iran). These horseflies mainly live in wetlands, lakes and streams and edge of forests.

Description

These relatively large and slender horseflies have clear wings and green or green with red shades eyes. The female's eyes have three bands, while in males they have just two bands. In any case the eyes are without hair. Females have scissor-like mouthparts that aim to cut the skin and then lap up the blood. Thorax has greyish longitudinal bands. The abdomen is chestnut brown with a series of yellow-brown markings.

Biology
Adults can be found from June to September. The females of this species are blood-sucking while the males feed on nectar. The females suck blood from cows, horses, but also people. These horseflies are strongly linked to grazing animals in open fields and they are probably very disadvantaged by their decreasing.

References

External links
 Galerie-insecte

Tabanidae
Diptera of Europe
Insects described in 1820
Taxa named by Johann Wilhelm Meigen